Farrars Creek is a rural locality in the Shire of Barcoo, Queensland, Australia.

Geography 
The watercourse Farrars Creek flows through the locality from the north-east (Stonehenge) to the south-west, where it becomes a tributary of the Diamantina River, part of the Lake Eyre drainage basin.

The Diamantina Developmental Road passes through the locality from the south-east (Windorah) to west (Bedourie). The Birdsville Developmental Road passes through the locality from the south-east (Windorah) to the south (Tanbar).

The principal land use is grazing on native vegetation.

History 
Karuwali (also known as Garuwali, Dieri) is a language of far western Queensland. The Karuwali language region includes the landscape within the local government boundaries of the Diamantina Shire Council, including the localities of Betoota and Haddon Corner.

The locality takes its name from the creek, which in turn takes its name after a stockman called Farrar who was employed on John Costello's pastoral property Kyabra.

References 

Shire of Barcoo
Localities in Queensland